Songwriters of Northern America (SONA) is a not-for-profit trade organization for songwriters' rights. It was founded by Michelle Lewis and Kay Hanley in January 2015, in order to advocate for fair remuneration for songwriters in the era of streaming digital music services. The organization allows songwriters to organize to lobby for better licensing rates for music creators with digital streaming companies like Spotify and Pandora. In 2016 the band sued the Justice Department who they claim "overstepped its authority and that its ruling violated the property rights of songwriters by potentially nullifying private contracts between writers who have worked on the same song." SONA also pressed for fair pay for songwriters within other music legislation including crafting, lobbying and working to pass the Music Modernization Act.

In addition to advocacy, SONA hosts "Back To School" nights and public speakers in order to educate songwriters at all levels on the complicated and ever-changing digital music industry. In 2020 the group, led by Michelle Lewis, Jess Furman and Sarah Robertson organized to offer emergency grants to songwriters facing economic hardship because of the COVID pandemic. In addition, SONA successfully lobbied for independent contractors to be included in the CARES Act and continued to lobby for fair inclusion of mixed earners in relief aid.

Overview 
SONA is almost entirely run by volunteers with leadership coming from their Board of Directors, made up of songwriters and music industry professionals.

Board of Directors 

 Michelle Lewis
 Kay Hanley
 Adam Dorn
 Adam Gorgoni
 Autumn Rowe
 Brendan Okrent
 Dina LaPolt
 Jack Kugell
 Jared Brenner
 Lauren Hancock
 Mark Pariser
 Michelle Featherstone
 Pamela Sheyne
 Priscilla Renea
 Shay M. Lawson
 Shelly Peiken

References

External links
 Official site

Music industry associations
Music organizations based in the United States